George Norman Johnston (September 13, 1884 – September 28, 1977) was a politician elected to the Legislative Assembly of Alberta for the first time in 1921. He served as Speaker of the Alberta Legislature from February 10, 1927, to July 22, 1935. He was defeated in 1935 when Social Credit swept to power. It was the second time in Alberta's history that a Speaker suffered electoral defeat.

References

Bibliography

External links
Followers of Moses: Biographies of United Farmers–era MLAs
Speaker of the Assembly

Speakers of the Legislative Assembly of Alberta
1884 births
1977 deaths
United Farmers of Alberta MLAs
People from Wingham, Ontario